Saltopus ("hopping foot") is a genus of very small bipedal dinosauriform containing the single species Saltopus elginensis from the late Triassic period of Scotland. It is one of the most famous Elgin Reptiles.

Description
 
Saltopus elginensis is known only from a single partial skeleton lacking the skull, but including parts of the vertebral column, the forelimbs, the pelvis and the hindlimbs. These have been mainly preserved as impressions or natural casts in the sandstone; very little bone material is present. It had hollow bones like those of birds and other dinosaurs. In 2016, it was estimated to be 50 cm long, 15 cm high at the hips, and 110 g. Most of the length was accounted for by the tail. It had five-fingered hands, with the fourth and fifth finger reduced in size. Contrary to the original description, in 2011 it was established that the sacrum (hip vertebrae) was made up of two vertebrae, the primitive ancestral condition, not four.

History
It was named and described by Friedrich von Huene in 1910 as the type species Saltopus elginensis. The generic name is derived from Latin saltare, "to jump" and Greek πούς, pous, "foot". The specific name refers to its provenance near Elgin, which yields the Elgin Reptiles. The holotype NHMUK R.3915, was excavated from the Lossiemouth Sandstone Formation dating from the Carnian-Norian stage.

Classification
Saltopus has been variously identified as a saurischian (lizard-hipped) dinosaur, a more advanced theropod, and a close relative of the herrerasaurs, but its taxonomy has been in dispute because only fragmentary remains have been recovered. Some researchers, such as Gregory S. Paul, have suggested it may represent a juvenile specimen of a coelophysid theropod such as Coelophysis or Procompsognathus. Rauhut and Hungerbühler in 2000 concluded it is a primitive dinosauriform, not a true dinosaur, closely related to Lagosuchus. Michael Benton, continuing the studies of the late Alick Walker redescribing the fossil in 2011, found it to be a dinosauriform more derived than Lagosuchus.

A large phylogenetic analysis of early dinosaurs and dinosauromorphs by Matthew Baron, David B. Norman and Paul Barrett (2017) recovered Saltopus near the base of the dinosaur lineage, suggesting that it may represent the closest relative of true dinosaurs.

References

External links
 A photograph of the sandstone slab showing the only known Saltopus specimen, published by the twitter account of the Barret Lab at the London Natural History Museum
 The counterpart of the Saltopus slab, from the same source

Prehistoric dinosauromorphs
Late Triassic reptiles of Europe
Triassic Scotland
Fossils of Scotland
Fossil taxa described in 1910
Taxa named by Friedrich von Huene
1910 in Scotland
History of Moray